The Ukrainian men's national 3x3 team represents Ukraine in international 3x3 basketball matches and is controlled by the Ukrainian Basketball Federation.

Senior Competitions

World Championships

Mixed Team

European Championships

Current squad

Current Youth Squad

See also
 3x3 basketball

External links

Men's national 3x3 basketball teams
Ukraine men's national basketball team